Turlough Convery (born 18 March 1991) is an Irish actor. He is best known for his television roles in series 3 of the BBC America series Killing Eve and in the ITV series Sanditon.

He has appeared in films such as Ready Player One and on television in Netflix Resident Evil the E4 series My Mad Fat Diary, the Channel 4 series Fresh Meat, 2014 Black Mirror episode 'White Christmas', the BBC One series Poldark, the 2018 miniseries Les Misérables. the 2019 psychological horror film Saint Maud and the 2021 film Belfast.

Early life and education
Born, March 1991, Convery attended Rockport School in Holywood where he excelled at Drama, and the sixth form at Our Lady and St Patrick's College in Belfast, where he received a number of drama prizes. He trained in Musical Theatre at the Guildford School of Acting, where he won the 2013 Stephen Sondheim Society Student Performer of the Year Award.

Filmography

Films

TV series

References

External links 

Living people
21st-century male actors from Northern Ireland
Alumni of the Guildford School of Acting
People educated at Rockport School
1991 births